Joel McElroy Carson III (born 1971) is a United States circuit judge of the United States Court of Appeals for the Tenth Circuit.

Biography 

Carson received his Bachelor of Business Administration from Texas Tech University and his Juris Doctor from the University of New Mexico School of Law.

At the start of his legal career Carson served as a law clerk to Judge Bobby Baldock of the United States Court of Appeals for the Tenth Circuit. He then went on to be a partner at the Roswell, New Mexico-based law firm of Hinkle, Hensley, Shanor & Martin, LLP, where he practiced for nine years. He served for five years as General Counsel of Mack Energy Corporation. He started his own law firm in 2014, where he practiced until becoming a Circuit Judge.

Carson served on New Mexico Governor Susana Martinez's energy and environment transition teams following her election in 2010. He is a member of the New Mexico Judicial Performance Evaluation Commission.

Federal judicial service

Magistrate judge tenure 

Carson served as a part-time United States magistrate judge of the United States District Court for the District of New Mexico from 2015 to 2018.

Court of Appeals service 

On December 20, 2017, President Donald Trump nominated Carson to serve as a United States Circuit Judge of the United States Court of Appeals for the Tenth Circuit, to the seat that was vacated by Judge Paul Joseph Kelly Jr., who assumed senior status on December 31, 2017. On February 14, 2018, a hearing on his nomination was held before the Senate Judiciary Committee. On March 15, 2018, his nomination was reported out of committee by a 15–6 vote. On May 11, 2018, the United States Senate invoked cloture on his nomination by a 71–24 vote. On May 15, 2018, his nomination was confirmed by a 77–21 vote. He received his commission on May 17, 2018.

References

External links 
 
 
 Biography at Carson Ryan LLC

1971 births
Living people
20th-century American lawyers
21st-century American lawyers
21st-century American judges
Judges of the United States Court of Appeals for the Tenth Circuit
New Mexico lawyers
People from Artesia, New Mexico
Texas Tech University alumni
United States court of appeals judges appointed by Donald Trump
United States magistrate judges
University of New Mexico School of Law alumni